La Rivière Espérance is a French TV series, 9 episodes of 90 minutes each, directed by Josée Dayan based on the novel by Christian Signol and shown in 1995 on France 2.

Synopsis

1832, Périgord : Benjamin and Marie are two childhood friends. Benjamin's father is a merchant sailor on the river Dordogne.

One day he says to his son: « When you're 13, I'll take you with me. » He keeps his promise and Benjamin becomes a sailor like his father. But in that circle, you have to be wary of everybody and of what they live for: the Dordogne.

Doing that job was Benjamin's dream, but could that dream become a nightmare? Fights with merchants and sailors sometimes finish off quite uglily. Will he be able to stay loyal to his friend Marie, or will his nightly 'rendez-vous' with  Emeline Lombard, daughter of the rich merchant on whom they depend, separate them?

Cast

Manuel Blanc : Benjamin Donardieu
Carole Richert : Marie Paradou
Claire Nebout : Emeline Lombard 
Jean-Claude Drouot : Victorien Donadieu
Élisabeth Depardieu : Elina Donadieu
Pascal Greggory : Alexandre Duthil
Bernard Verley : Arsène Lombard
Hélène Vincent : Agnès Lombard
Raoul Billerey : priest of Souillac
Arnaud Giovaninetti : Pierre Bourdelle
Jean-Pierre Kalfon : Corentin
Roger Souza : Félix Marcas
Josée Dayan : Marin Borgne
Aurélien Wiik : Benjamin at 13 
Laura Martel : Marie at 13 
Eugénia Costantini : Emeline at 13 
Stephan Guérin-Tillie : Aubin Donnadieu
Sandra Speichert : Virginie Duthil
Philippe Clay : the Duthils' butler
Jean-Yves Gauthier : Vincent Paradou
Marianne Epin : Jeanne Paradou
Quentin Ogier : Jean Paradou
Thierry Rey : Ghilain Claveille
François Négret : Jacques Malaurie
Julie Dumas : Juliette
Thierry Redler : Louis Lafaurie
Emmanuelle Meyssignac : Madame Lasalle
Hans Meyer : Commander Dugay Trouin
Claude Faraldo : Ambroise Debord
Jean-Louis Tribes : 'La Bourgogne'
Didier Flamand : 'off' voice (summaries)
Jennifer Lauret : Virginie at 13

External links
 IMDb entry

Riv